A viola concerto is a concerto contrasting a viola with another body of musical instruments such as an orchestra or chamber music ensemble.  Early examples of viola concertos include Telemann's concerto in G major and several concertos by Carl Stamitz and other members of his family. The first concertante work to use the viola without caution was Mozart's violin and viola Sinfonia Concertante.

Revitalization of the viola concerto 
A number of violists and composers are credited with revitalizing the viola concerto and expanding its repertoire. 

British violist Lionel Tertis is often credited with popularizing the viola as a solo instrument in the early 20th century through advocating for the composition of new pieces, as well as arranging works for the viola. A number of works were dedicated to Tertis including concertos by William Walton and York Bowen, and other concertante works such as Arnold Bax's Phantasy for Viola and Orchestra. Tertis also commissioned pieces such as Ralph Vaughan William's Flos Campi and Gustav Holst's Lyric Movement for Viola and Small Orchestra, in addition to transposing works for the viola such as Edward Elgar's Cello Concerto and Frederick Delius's Caprice and Elegy for cello and orchestra. 

William Primrose was also an important figure in establishing the role of the viola as a soloist, having a number of concertos dedicated to him by composers such as Quincy Porter and Darius Milhaud. He also commissioned works for the viola, the most famous of which being Béla Bartók's Viola Concerto.

Selected list of concertos and concertante works

Samuel Adler
Viola Concerto (1999)
Julia Adolphe
Unearth, Release (2016)
Airat Ichmouratov
Concerto No. 1 for viola and orchestra, Op. 7 (2004) 
Concerto No. 2 "Rennsteig" for viola and string orchestra with harpsichord, Op. 41 (2015) 
Fantasy on D. Shostakovich's Opera "Lady Macbeth of Mtsensk" for viola and orchestra, Op. 12 (2006)
3 Romances for viola, string orchestra and harp, Op. 22 (2009)
Miguel del Aguila
Concierto en Tango (2014)
Kalevi Aho
Viola Concerto (2006)
Necil Kazım Akses
Viola Concerto (1977)
Malcolm Arnold
Viola Concerto with small orchestra, Op. 108 (1971)
Henk Badings
Concerto for Viola and String Orchestra (1965)
Johann Sebastian Bach
Brandenburg Concerto No. 6 (Solo parts for two violas)
Simon Bainbridge
Viola Concerto (1976)
Lubor Bárta
Concerto for Viola and Orchestra (1957)
Béla Bartók
Viola Concerto
Stanley Bate
Viola Concerto, op.46 (1944–6)
Arnold Bax
Phantasy for Viola and Orchestra (1920)
Sadao Bekku
Concerto for Viola and Orchestra (1971)
William Henry Bell
Rosa Mystica, Concerto for viola and orchestra (1916)
Jiří Antonín Benda
Viola Concerto in F major (about 1775)
Hector Berlioz
Harold en Italie
Valentin Bibik
Concerto No. 1 for Viola and Chamber Orchestra, Op. 53 (1984)
Concerto No. 2 for Viola and Orchestra, Op. 104 (1994)
Boris Blacher
Viola Concerto (1954)
Herbert Blendinger (b.1936)
Concerto for viola and orchestra, Op. 38 (1982) 
Concerto for viola and string orchestra, Op. 16 (1962)
Ernest Bloch
Suite for Viola and Orchestra (1919)
Suite Hébraïque (1951)
York Bowen
Viola Concerto (1908)
Tim Brady
Viola Concerto (2012)
Joly Braga Santos
Viola Concerto Op.34
Johannes Brahms
Viola Concerto (1894)
Max Bruch
Romance for viola and orchestra, Op. 85
Concerto for Clarinet, Viola and Orchestra, Op. 88
Revol Bunin
Viola Concerto, Op. 22 (1953)
Willy Burkhard
Viola Concerto, Op. 93 (1953/54)
Diana Burrell
Viola Concerto “...calling, leaping, crying, dancing...” (1994)
Britta Byström
"A walk after dark", viola and orchestra (2013)
Cristian Carrara
"The Waste Land", viola concerto (2016)
Henri Casadesus
Concerto in B minor in the style of George Frideric Handel
Concerto in C minor in the style of Johann Christian Bach
Rebecca Clarke
Sonata for Viola and Orchestra (1919)
Benjamin Dale
 Romance
Gyula Dávid
Viola Concerto (1950)
Music for Viola and Orchestra (2011)
Brett Dean
Viola Concerto (2004)
Edison Denisov
Viola Concerto (1986)
Carl Ditters von Dittersdorf
Viola Concerto in F major
Cornelis Dopper
Nocturne for Viola and Orchestra (1937)
Iván Erőd
Concerto for viola and orchestra, Op. 30 (1979–1980)
Koncertant Fantasy for viola and string orchestra, Op. 35 (1980–1981)
Morton Feldman
The Viola in My Life IV (1971)
Cecil Forsyth
Viola Concerto in G minor (1903)
Benjamin Frankel
Viola Concerto, Op. 45 (1967)
Kenneth Fuchs
Divinum Mysterium (2010)
Srul Irving Glick
Concerto for Viola and Strings
Steven Gellman
Viola Concerto (2004)
Mikhail Goldstein
Concerto in C Major
Evgeny Golubev
Viola Concerto, Op. 57 (1962)
Morton Gould
Viola Concerto (1943)
Geoffrey Gordon
Meditation and Allegro for Viola and Ensemble (2010)
Ignatz Gspan
Concerto in C major for Viola and Orchestra (Strings) (18th century)
Sofia Gubaidulina
Concerto for viola and orchestra (1996)
Two Paths: A Dedication to Mary and Martha for two viola solo and orchestra (1998)
John Harbison
Viola Concerto (1988)
Hans Henkemans
Viola Concerto (1954, premiered 1956)
Jacques Hétu
Viola Concerto Op.75
Jennifer Higdon
Viola Concerto (2015)
Paul Hindemith
Kammermusik No. 5 for viola and chamber orchestra
Konzertmusik for Viola with Chamber Orchestra
Der Schwanendreher 
Trauermusik for viola and strings
Franz Anton Hoffmeister
Viola Concerto in B flat major
Viola Concerto in D major
Robin Holloway
Viola Concerto (1984)
Gustav Holst
Lyric Movement for Viola and Small Orchestra (1933)
Alan Hovhaness
Talin for Viola and Strings, Op. 93, No. 1 (1951–52)
Herbert Howells
Elegy for Viola, String Quartet and String Orchestra, Op. 15 (1917)
Johann Nepomuk Hummel
Potpourri for Viola and Orchestra, Op. 94
Gordon Jacob
Concerto for Viola and Orchestra (1925)
Viola Concerto No. 2 (1979)
Michael Jarrell
Emergences-Résurgences (2016)
Joseph Jongen
Suite, Op. 48 (1915)
Giya Kancheli
Viola Concerto Mourned by the Wind (1986)
Nigel Keay
Viola Concerto (2000) 
Aaron Jay Kernis
Viola Concerto (2014)
Erland von Koch
Viola Concerto, Op. 33 (1946 rev. 1966)
Joseph Martin Kraus
Viola Concerto in C Major
Viola Concerto in E-flat Major
Samuel de Lange
Viola Concerto (1900)
Victor Legley
Viola Concerto, Op. 78 (1971)
Peter Lieberson
Viola Concerto (1992)
Zdeněk Lukáš (born 1928) (Kabeláč student)
Viola Concerto (1983) 
Peter Machajdík
Behind the Waves (Concerto for Solo Viola and String Orchestra) (2016)    
Between the Waves (Concerto for Solo Viola and String Orchestra) (2021)    
James MacMillan
Viola Concerto (2013)
Jef Maes
Viola Concerto (1943)
Bohuslav Martinů
Rhapsody-Concerto for Viola and Orchestra (1952)
Darius Milhaud
Viola Concerto with orchestra of soloists, Op. 108 (1929)
Concertino d'été, Op. 311 (1951)
Viola Concerto No. 2, Op. 340 (1955; for William Primrose)
Air (from Sonata No. 1), Op. 242 (1944)
Wolfgang Amadeus Mozart
Sinfonia Concertante for Violin, Viola and Orchestra
Paul Müller-Zürich
Viola Concerto in F minor, Op. 24 (1934)
Nico Muhly
Viola Concerto (2015)
Thea Musgrave
Lamenting with Ariadne for Viola and Chamber Orchestra
Gösta Nystroem
Viola Concerto Hommage à la France (1940)
Niccolò Paganini
Viola Concerto (1820) 
 Sonata per la Grand Viola (1834)
Joseph de Pasquale
Theme and Variations for viola, string orchestra, and harp (1954)
Variations for viola, string orchestra, and harp (1984)
Krzysztof Penderecki
Viola Concerto (1983)
Allan Pettersson
Viola Concerto (1979)
Walter Piston
Viola Concerto (1957)
Mikhail Pletnev
Viola Concerto (1997)
Quincy Porter
Viola Concerto (1948)
Behzad Ranjbaran
Concerto for Viola and Orchestra (2014)
Alessandro Rolla (1757–1841)
Concertino in E-flat major for Viola and Orchestra (or String Quartet), BI. 328/546
Introduction and Divertimento in F major for Viola and Large Orchestra (incomplete), BI. 329
Divertimento in F major for viola and orchestrad'archi, BI. 330
Rondo in G major for viola and string orchestra, 2 oboes and 2 horns, BI.331
Divertimento in G major for viola and orchestra, BI. 332
Adagio and Thema with Variations in G major for viola and orchestra, BI. 333
Concerto in C major for viola and orchestra, BI. 541
Concerto in D major for viola and orchestra, BI. 542
Concerto in D major for viola and orchestra, BI. 543
Concerto in E-flat major for viola and orchestra, BI. 544
Concerto in E-flat major for viola and orchestra, BI. 545
Concerto in E-flat major for viola and orchestra, BI. 547
Concerto in E major for viola and orchestra, BI. 548
Concerto in F major for viola and orchestra, BI. 549
Concerto in F major for viola and orchestra, BI. 550
Concerto in F major for viola and orchestra, BI. 551
Concerto in F major for viola and orchestra, BI. 552
Concerto in F major for viola and orchestra, BI. 553
Concerto in F major for viola and orchestra, BI. 554
Concerto in B-flat major for viola and orchestra, BI. 555
Antonio Rolla (1798–1837)
Variazioni Brillanti in F major for Viola and Orchestra, Op. 13 (1822)
Julius Röntgen
Triple concerto in B-flat major, for violin, viola, cello and strings (1922)
Triple concerto for violin, viola and cello (1930)
Introduction, Fugue, Intermezzo and Finale for violin, viola, cello
Hilding Rosenberg
Viola Concerto (1942, 1964, 1945)
Miklós Rózsa
Viola Concerto, Op. 37 (1979)
Edmund Rubbra
Viola Concerto in A minor, Op. 75
Ahmet Adnan Saygun
Concerto for Viola and Orchestra (1977)
Alfred Schnittke
Viola Concerto (1985)
Joseph Schubert
Viola Concerto in C major
Viola Concerto in E-flat major
Robert Schumann
Märchenbilder for viola and orchestra (1851)
Peter Sculthorpe
Elegy for Viola and Strings (2006)
Peter Seabourne
Viola Concerto (2020)
Tibor Serly
Concerto for Viola and Orchestra (1929)
Rhapsody for Viola and Orchestra (1948)
Dmitri Shostakovich
String Quartet No. 13 for Viola and Orchestra (1970)
Sonata for Viola, Percussion, and Orchestra (1975) 
Ragnar Soderlind
Viola Concerto “Nostalgia delle radici” (2003)
Anton Stamitz
Concerto in B-flat major
Concerto in F major for viola and strings (1779)  
Concerto in G major 
Concerto in D major 
Carl Stamitz
Concerto No. 1 in D major (1774) 
Concerto No. 2 in B-flat/A major
Concerto No. 3 in A major
Johann Stamitz
Concertos
Frank Stiles
Viola Concerto (1955)
Toru Takemitsu
A String Around Autumn (1989)
Cengiz Tanç
Concerto for Viola and Orchestra (1986)
Josef Tal
Concerto for viola & orchestra (1953)
Georg Philipp Telemann
Concerto in G major, TWV 51:G9
Haukur Tomasson
Echo Chamber for viola and orchestra (2015)
Joan Tower
Purple Rhapsody for viola and orchestra (2005)
Johann Baptist Wanhal
Viola Concerto in C major
Viola Concerto in F major
William Walton
Viola Concerto in A minor (1928–29, revised in 1961.)
Leó Weiner
Ballad for Viola and Orchestra
Jörg Widmann
Viola concerto
John Williams
Concerto for Viola and Orchestra (2009)
John Woolrich
Ulysses Awakes (1989)
Viola Concerto (1993)
Ralph Vaughan Williams
Suite for Viola and Orchestra
Suite Flos Campi for Viola, Chorus and Orchestra 
Carl Friedrich Zelter
Viola Concerto E-flat major
Bernd Alois Zimmermann
 Antiphonen für Viola und 25 Instrumentalisten

Notes 
 Unfinished, completed by Tibor Serly.

 Transcription of the composer's  Clarinet (or Viola) Sonata, Op. 120 No. 1 by composer Luciano Berio.

 The sonata for viola and piano orchestrated in 2004-5 by Ruth Lomon.

 From the composer's Suite in D major for viola and piano (1906), Op. 2, arranged for viola and orchestra (1909).

 Attributed to Ivan Khandoshkin.

 Attributed to Roman Hoffstetter.

 A revised version — a version for larger orchestra was premiered by Monteux, conducting, Paul Hindemith, viola in Amsterdam.

 Transcription of Paganini's Guitar Quartet No. 15.

 Three versions - 1942, 1964, both for viola and strings, 1945 for larger orchestra.

 Arranged by conductor, pianist, and composer Max Erdmannsdörfer from the composer's Märchenbilder for piano and viola, Op. 113.

 Transcription of Shostakovich's String Quartet No. 13 by composer and pianist Alexander Tchaikovsky. 

 Transcription of Shostakovich's Sonata for Viola and Piano by violist and composer Vladimir Mendelssohn.

 Recordings on Panton and on Koch Schwann CDs, and on a 1980 Supraphon LP. A score was published by Schött in Mainz and New York in 1972.

 Score published by Schött in 1970. Referred to as concerto no. 2.

 Published by Breitkopf und Härtel in 1971. Referred to as concerto no. 3. See also the comment under Carl Stamitz.

 Published by Breitkopf und Härtel in 1973. At least one of Anton Stamitz' concertos was published earlier by Sieber in Paris during the 18th century.

 At least one, in G major, published by Litolff in 1962. May have been meant for viola d'amore.

 Composed for and dedicated to Winifred Copperwheat.

 Famously played by many students.

 According to the Duke university Wanhal page both were originally for violoncello or bassoon.

 Premiered by Paul Hindemith.

 Version of the Ballad for Clarinet and Orchestra Op. 28, the score published by EMB Budapest, the viola part published by Rózsavölgyi Budapest, sold with the Clarinet-Piano version numbered Op. 8, see IMSLP.

 Premiered by Ilari Angervo (viola) & Finnish Radio Symphony Orchestra, cond. by Ernest Martinez-Izquierdo.

 Technically not a concerto.

See also

Viola sonata
String instrument repertoire

References

External links
 Viola website, hosting information about the viola. 
 Michael Haydn page with Many Classical and Early-Romantic Worklists
 Viola Fan Club and Repertoire List
Viola in music - The role of viola in music. Information, description of works, videos, free sheet music, MIDI files, RSS update.